Byam Martin Island (BEI-uhm) is one of the uninhabited members of the Queen Elizabeth Islands in the Canadian arctic islands located on the northern side of the Viscount Melville Sound in the territory of Nunavut. It is separated from the eastern coast of Melville Island,  to the west, by the Byam Martin Channel; and from Bathurst Island,  to the northeast, by the Austin Channel.

The island was named after Sir Thomas Byam Martin by Sir William Edward Parry in August 1819 during his first expedition to discover the Northwest Passage.

References

External links
 Byam Martin Island in the Atlas of Canada - Toporama; Natural Resources Canada

Islands of the Queen Elizabeth Islands
Uninhabited islands of Qikiqtaaluk Region